The brown twinspot (Clytospiza monteiri) is a common species of estrildid finch found in sub-Saharan Africa. It is the only member of the genus Clytospiza.

It is found in Angola, Cameroon, Central African Republic, Chad, the Republic of Congo, the Democratic Republic of the Congo, Gabon, Kenya, Nigeria, South Sudan and Uganda. It has an estimated global extent of occurrence of 1,200,000 km2. The IUCN has classified the species as being of least concern.

The brown twinspot is sister to the firefinches in the genus Lagonosticta.

References

External links
BirdLife International species factsheet

brown twinspot
Birds of Central Africa
brown twinspot